Martin Brunner (born 23 April 1963 in Zürich) is a retired Swiss football goalkeeper, who was capped 36 times for the Swiss national team. He was an unused substitute at the 1994 FIFA World Cup.

Clubs
 1983–1994:  Grasshopper Club Zürich
 1994–1999:  Lausanne Sports

Honours
Grasshoppers
 Swiss Championship: 1983–84, 1989–90, 1990–91
 Swiss Cup: 1987–88, 1988–89, 1989–90, 1993–94
 Swiss Super Cup: 1989

References

1963 births
Living people
Swiss men's footballers
Association football goalkeepers
1994 FIFA World Cup players
Switzerland international footballers
Swiss Super League players
Grasshopper Club Zürich players
FC Lausanne-Sport players
Footballers from Zürich